Emme Wong Yee-Man (born 3 January 1981) is a Cantopop singer and actress based in Hong Kong.

Biography

Wong originally debuted under the name "Dior Wong" in late 2001, as one of Universal Records's promising new pop starlets. As Dior Wong, she sported a clean and youthful image, and released her first EP Pure Impression (純屬印象) in November. She followed with her first full-length album Scents (香薰) in July 2002.

After a brief hiatus, she changed her name to Emme and returned with her second album (self-titled) in 2003, marked by a new, more mature playgirl image, and uptempo dance tunes which she has been noted for ever since. The subsequent EP Good Show released in 2004 continues in the same vein. She returned in May 2008 with the new dance/electronic single Aspire (渴求), and the album The Groove in Me in August.

Wong has, over the years, recorded many Cantonese covers of songs originally sung in English, including "What Took You So Long" by Emma Bunton (純屬印象), "Round Round" by the Sugababes (戒男), "Show Me Love" by t.A.T.u., and most recently a remixed version of "He Doesn't Love You" by Sarah McLeod (渴求).

Emme Wong graduated from Interior Design in Canada; she has signed to Entertainment Impact as her manager and made her debut in 2001, with her tall and trendy appearance to enter the Hong Kong entertainment industry, she became popular and was immediately invited to sign a singer contract with Universal Music Limited, with her first album [Impression]. After completing the training courses for singing and dancing technique in Japan in 2003, Emme has successfully shown to the public the energetic and powerful dance performances when singing vigor songs. Meanwhile, her hit song "Guy Hunter" won the attention and outstanding awards in different music awards ceremonies. Moreover, her song "Angel Territory" from album [EMME] was cooperated with the famous Japanese producer, Masataka Matsutoya, and the famous Japanese singer Matsutoya Yumi as backing vocals. In addition, album [The Groove in Me] was highly complimented by Andy Lau and Hacken Lee, and Emme has been named by Alan Tam to be the special performance guest for his ten consecutive concerts in Hong Kong.
 
Besides the career in singing, Emme has a versatile development in show business by participating in films (including "Colour of The Loyalty", "Confession of Pain" etc.), TV dramas (including "Kung Fu Soccer", "Magic Chef" etc.), events host, advertisements, lyric compositions, and fashion shows etc. In 2006, Emme acted in a national education movie of "A Chinese Fairy Tale" with one of the Best Actor Awards' winners, Tony Leung Ka Fai, for the first time in Beijing. On the other hand, Emme composed lyrics for her song "Cruel" which became popular because of the touching wordings, and its ringing tone stood in the top download charts for several months.
 
Emme began to start a business outside of her artistic career in recent years. She introduced the French watch brand GALTISCOPIO to Hong Kong in 2009, and it was voted as one of the best brands of a famous fashion magazine in Hong Kong within one year. GALTISCOPIO expanded its business to the Chinese market in 2010 and opened new stores in Beijing, Chengdu, Hangzhou and other big cities. In 2011, the company further explored to Taiwan, Malaysia, Singapore and other Asian markets.
 
To commemorate the return of Hong Kong 15th anniversary (1997–2012), "Management World" of the Beijing authorities held an election of "Bauhinia Merit", Emme and other 54 outstanding & successful Chinese entrepreneurs were elected and compiled into a book, in recognition of their excellence in industrial and commercial achievements, as well as the contribution to the economic and social development in Hong Kong and Mainland China.

Discography 
 Pure Impression (純屬印象) 2001, EP
 Scents(香薰) 2002, album
 Emme 2003, album
 Good Show 2004, album
 The Groove in Me 2008, album

Filmography
 OCTB (2017) (TV series)
 Good Take! (2016)
 Lan Kwai Fong (2011)
 Sasori (2008)
 Kung Fu Fighter (2007)
 Confession of Pain (2006)
 Colour of the Loyalty (2005)
 Beyond Our Ken (2004)
 My Sweetie (2004)

Personal life
Wong married actor Danny Chan Kwok-kwan on 27 October 2014.

References

External links 
  Emme's Official website @ Universal Music HK
 Emme's Official Website

 Emme's Sina Blog
Emme's Official Artist Profile Page on AliveNotDead
 Emme's Yahoo Blog
Emme's Profile

1981 births
Living people
Cantopop singers
21st-century Hong Kong women singers